Rolling Prairie is an unincorporated community and census-designated place (CDP) in Kankakee Township, LaPorte County, Indiana, United States. As of the 2010 census, it had a population of 582.

History
The first cabin was built here in 1831 by Ezekiel Provolt. More settlers arrived, built cabins and named the settlement "Nauvoo".  On November 26, 1853, the village was platted by J. W. Walker and named "Portland". The name of "Rolling Prairie", descriptive of the undulating terrain, was later adopted by one of the railroad companies operating through the town.

Rolling Prairie had a stop on the South Shore Line until 1994, when it was closed along with several other flag stops with low ridership.

Geography
U.S. Route 20 passes through the southern side of the community, leading east  to South Bend and west  to Michigan City. Indiana State Road 2 passes just south of Rolling Prairie, leading southwest  to La Porte, the county seat.

Education
Rolling Prairie has a public library, a branch of the La Porte County Public Library. Rolling Prairie Elementary School occupies the building that was previously Rolling Prairie High School before the high school was merged with New Carlisle High School to form New Prairie High School. The elementary is one of three elementary schools in the New Prairie United School Corporation.

Demographics

References

Census-designated places in LaPorte County, Indiana
Census-designated places in Indiana